Barasana (alternate names Barazana, Panenua, Pareroa, or Taiwano is an exonym applied to an Amazonian people, considered distinct from the Taiwano, though the dialect of the latter is almost identical to that of the Barasana, and outside observers can detect only minute differences between the two languages. They are a Tucanoan group located in the eastern part of the Amazon Basin in Vaupés Department in Colombia (Apaporis River) and Amazonas State in Brazil. As of 2000, there were at least 500 Barasanas in Colombia, although some recent estimates place the figure as high as 1,950. A further 40 live on the Brazilian side, in the municipalities of Japurá and São Gabriel da Cachoeira.

The Barasana refers to themselves as the jebá.~baca, or people of the jaguar (Jebá "jaguar" is their mythical ancestor).

Geography, ecology
Barasana territory lies in the central sector of the Colombian Northwest Amazon. The Barasana inhabit the Pirá-piraná river basin of the Comiseria de Vaupés between the two main river systems of the Vaupés River  and the Japurá River . The area is a tropical rainforest, interspersed with occasional stands of Mauritia flexuosa or mirití palm and savanna with xerophytic vegetation.

Its climate is marked by four seasons, a long dry spell from December to March followed by the wet season from March to August, a short dry season between August and September, followed by a rainy season from September until December. The average temperature varies between 20 and 30 degrees Celsius (68 and 86 °F). It is notorious for its treacherous  rivers that are choked with dangerous rapids and falls. The number of faunal species is not rich, and individual animals not common,  though hunting game is prized as the  fundamentally male mode of procuring food. Fish also, despite the many rivers, do not abound.

Ethnic group context
The Vaupés area is inhabited  by roughly 20 tribes or descent groups. The word tribe is generally disdained by anthropologists, who prefer to define groups by such terms as sib, language group, exogamous group or phratry, living in an unbounded system, that is cosmopolitan and multilingual. Apart from the  Maku and the Arawakan,  Vaupés Indians  belong to Eastern Tukanoan language family, most prominent of them being, other than the Barasana, the Desana, the Bará, the Tukano proper, the Macuna, the Tatuyo, and the Cubeo. Despite the established system of intermarriage, their languages are mutually unintelligible. A Creole-type lingua franca, called locally lingua geral, created by the Jesuit missionaries as a general language for communicating with Indians in the lower reaches of the Amazon, is also spoken among them.

History
The various Tukanoan myths of origin refer to a westward upstream migration from Brazil, and Reichel-Dolmatoff believes that there is a ‘kernel of historical truth’ behind these uniform traditions.  Curt Nimuendajú thought that the east Tukanoan tribes invaded from the west, and that the autochthonous population consisted of the Makú, assuming that these smaller hunter-gatherers were older than the agriculturalist newcomers. Desultory Spanish contact with the Vaupés region goes back to the 16th century. But historical records show that the Tukano peoples shifted to the remote headwaters of the Río Negro as a refuge, in flight from the slave trade and diseases, and forced relocations introduced by the Portuguese in the late 18th.century. It was Alfred Russel Wallace, in travelling up the Vaupés river in 1850 who first took note of Indians like the Barasana and their dialects. and the rites of their Yurupary cult. According to his account, traders were already active in the area. Catholic and Protestant missionaries entered the area in the last decades of the 19th century. One major reaction to this evangelisation in the Vaupés, initiated by Venancio Aniseto Kamiko, was to create a wave of messianic cults among the tribes. Missionaries were convinced that the central cult of Yurupary, their culture hero, was the work of the Devil, though this was a series of rituals rather than a divinity. The result was widespread damage to the native culture. as ceremonial houses were burnt, ritual ornaments destroyed, and secret masks displayed to the tribe’s women and children, who were previously  forbidden to look at them.  Messianic shamanism, strongly connected with jaguar shamanism, declined further with the establishment of Catholic missions in the first decades of the 20th century. The German traveller Theodor Koch-Grünberg spent two years at the turn of the century (1903–05) travelling throughout the region and provided a classic account of the Indians’ material culture and languages, which long remained the authoritative source for information of these tribes.  Rubber-gatherers from the beginning of the 20th century began to aggressively exploit the area, as they did again the World War II when the urgency of improved rubber supplies led to a rubber boom in the area. Their violent presence caused considerable upheaval and suffering, finally driving the Indians, after fierce resistance, into the less accessible backwaters. Population decline, as a result, has been a marked feature of the past one hundred and fifty years, The earliest professional  ethnological fieldwork was done by Irving Goldman in 1939-40 among the Cubeo Indians.  Postwar missionary work, colonizing movements, and the activities of the linguists attached to Christian proselytisation still engage, according to Stephen Hugh-Jones, in the ‘criminal folly’ of ethnocide  by their programmatic hostility to traditional religion

Economy
The Barasana are slash-and-burn  swidden horticulturalists who supplement their food with hunting and fish-gathering, with different roles allocated to men (poisoners) and  women (gatherers of the poisoned catch). The economy is inelastic, subsistence-oriented and egalitarian. As both hunter-gatherers, and gardeners, the Barasana exploit the forest in various ways to obtain a wide variety of foodstuffs. Bread made of bitter cassava is their staple food; Barasana culture itself is said to be grounded on cultivation of cassava production. but they also harvest maize, bananas, cooking plantains, yams, sweet potatoes, pineapples, sugarcane and considerable quantities of fruits picked in the forests or from cultivated trees like the Pithecellobium dulce, the "Madras thorn" or mene. Fishing supplies most of the protein in their diet, supplemented by game, rodents  and birds mostly, but woolly monkeys and peccaries are also culled, traditionally with blowguns, but most recently also with shotguns. Unlike most South American peoples, the Barasana are not particularly passionate about honey, which they gather occasionally. Beeswax, on the other hand, is highly prized for its use in ceremonial contexts. From cassava leaves they extract a native chicha. Coca and tobacco, the latter prepared either in cigars or as snuff, are also cultivated. They prepare their local entheogenic drink ayahuasca, which they call yagé, from the endemic Banisteriopsis caapi,  a liana locally known as "vine of the soul" or "vine of the ancestors".

Social structure
The Tukunoan descent groups are subdivided into ranked and named sibs. The dominant feature of their social organization is language group exogamy, which requires that one must always marry a spouse speaking a language different from one’s own.  Among the Barasana themselves, exceptions however do exist to the principle of linguistic exogamy, since they intermarry with Taiwanos whose language is regarded as almost identical to their own. This means that one’s father’s language determines one’s inclusion or exclusion in Barasana identity, which accounts for the custom of virilocality. Women marrying out, though speaking Barasana as their native tongue, are therefore excluded from Barasana identity. Concern for exogamy is obsessive and is considered by Reichel-Dolmstoff to be the most important social rule of all.

The Vaupés social system may be divided in four units in ascending hierarchy, namely (a) the local descent group, (2) the sib, (3) the language-aggregate, and finally (4) the phratry. Kinship is based on a ‘a Dravidian’ type sib system, with bilateral cross-cousin marriage between people from hierarchically order patrilineal sibs.
Like most other groups of the Vaupés system, the Barasana are an exogamous  patrilineal   and patrilocal  descent group, with a segmentary social structure. The constitutive groups live in isolated settlements in units of four to eight families  dwelling in multifamily longhouses.

The Barasana have seven exogamous phratries, and five sibs, common descendants of the Yebi Meni Anaconda people, traditionally ranked hierarchically in decreasing order of seniority, with each assigned a distinct ritual role as (1) Koamona, ritual chiefs (2) Rasegana, dancers and chanters (3) Meni Masa, warriors (4) Daria, shamans and (5) Wabea, cigar lighters. These  ritual functions restricted to distinct sibs, reflect a dying tradition, and survive now mainly as a matter of ideology. Barasana society is rigidly divided along sexual lines. Men and women enter dwellings by different doors, pass most of their lives in separation, a reality reinforced by their ceremonial Yurupari rites. Yet in Vaupés societies women have higher status, and marriages are more stable than in other South Amerindian groups, perhaps since intertribal warfare ended several decades ago, which may explain why women are not ‘pawns in the displays of male brinksmanship.’

Language

Barasana is classified as one of the eastern Tucanoan languages. It is mutually intelligible with Taiwano, and both are considered dialect variations of each other, though it is reported that Taiwano speakers are assimilating to the Barasana with whom they have very close relations of exchange, leading them to adopt the Barasana tongue.

Popular culture
The Barasana were the subject of Disappearing World (TV series), episode 4, The War of the Gods, aired on 22 June 1971 for British Granada Television. The episode shows four young anthropologists travelling into the jungle to show how to live as a Barasana, before getting into a deeper debate about what it means to be a marginalised tribe in a changing world and documenting Barasana magical rituals and traditions.

Notes

References

Wilbert, Johannes; Levinson, David (1994). Encyclopedia of World Cultures. Volume 7: South America. Boston: G. K. Hall. 
Aĭkhenvald, Aleksandra Yurievna, Language contact in Amazonia.  Oxford University Press, 2002 
Bignell, Paul  ‘The beckoning silence: Why half of the world's languages are in serious danger of dying out’, The Independent, 13 December 2009
Brüzzi Alves da Silva, A civilização indígena do Uaupés: observações antropológicas etnográficas e sociológicas, (Centro de Pesquisas de Iauareté, São Paulo, 1962), 2nd.ed. LAS, 1977
 Conselho Indigenista Missionário
Donkin, R.A.  'The Peccary', in Transactions, American Philosophical Society, (vol. 75), Part 5, 1985 pp. 1–152
Goldman, Irving ‘The Tribes of the Uapes-Caqueta Region,’ in J.W.Steward (ed.) Handbook of South American IndiansSmithsonian Institution, Bureau of American Ethnology, Bulletin 143, 3, Washington D.C. 1948 pp. 763–798
Goldman, Irving, The Cubeo Indians of the Northwest Amazon,  (1963) University of Illinois Press, 2nd.ed. 1979 
Gomez-Imbert,Elsa  'Conceptual categories and linguistic classification,' in John J. Gumperz, Stephen C. Levinson (eds.)  Rethinking Linguistic Relativity,  Cambridge University Press, 1996   
Hill, Jonathan David, History, power, and identity: ethnogenesis in the Americas, 1492-1992,  University of Iowa Press, 1996 
Hill, Jonathan David Made-from-bone:: trickster myths, music, and history from the Amazon,  University of Illinois Press, 2008 
Hugh-Jones, Christine, From the Milk River: Spatial and temporal processes in Northwest Amazonia, Cambridge University Press, Cambridge 1979 ,
Hugh-Jones, Stephen, The Palm and the Pleiades: Initiation and Cosmology in Northwest Amazonia, Cambridge University Press, Cambridge 1979 
Stephen Hugh-Jones, ‘Shamans, Prophets, Priests and Pastors,’ in Nicholas Thomas & Caroline Humphrey (eds.), Shamanism, history, and the state, University of Michigan Press, (1994)1996 pb. pp. 32–75 
Gomez-Imbert, Elsa, ‘Conceptual categories and linguistic classification’, in John Joseph Gumperz, Stephen C. Levinson (eds.) Rethinking linguistic relativity,  Cambridge University Press, 1996 Cambridge University Press, 1996 pp. 438–469 
Gomez-Imbert, Elsa, & Kenstowicz, Michael, ‘Barasana Tone and Accent,’ in International Journal of American Linguistics, Vol. 66, No. 4 (Oct., 2000), pp. 419–463
Jackson, Jean Elizabeth, ‘Language Identity of the Vaupés Indians,’ in Richard Bauman, Joel Sherzer (eds.) Explorations in the ethnography of speaking, Cambridge University Press, 1974 ch.2 pp. 50–64
Jackson, Jean Elizabeth, The fish people: linguistic exogamy and Tukanoan identity in northwest Amazonia, Cambridge University Press, 1983, 
Koch-Grünberg, Theodor, Zwei Jahre unter den Indianern: Reisen in Nordwest Brasilien 1903/1903, Wasmuth Verlag, Berlin, 2 vols. 1909/1910
Langdon, Thomas Allen, Food restrictions in the medical system of the Barasana and Taiwano Indians of the Colombian Northwest Amazon, (Doctoral thesis, Tulane University 1975) UMI, 1978
Moseley, Christopher (ed.), Encyclopedia of the world's endangered languages, Routledge, 2007 
Myers, O. Gene, The significance of children and animals: social development and our connections to other species, Purdue University Press (1998), 2nd.rev.ed. 2007 
Reichel-Dolmatoff, Gerardo, ‘Review of The Cubeo: Indians of the Northwest Amazon by Irving Goldman ,’ in American Anthropologist, New Series, Vol. 65, No. 6 (Dec., 1963), pp. 1377–1379
Reichel-Dolmatoff, Gerardo, Amazonian Cosmos: The Sexual and Religious Symbolism of the Tukano Indians, University of Chicago Press, Chicago and London 1971 
Reichel-Dolmatoff, Gerardo, Shamanism and art of the eastern Tukanoan Indians: Colombian northwest Amazon, BRILL, 1987 
Reichel-Dolmatoff, Gerardo, Yuruparí: studies of an Amazonian foundation myth, Harvard University Center for the Study of World Religions, 1996 
Rubio, François Correa . Por el Camino de la Anaconda Remedio, Univ. Nacional de Colombia, 1996
Schultes, Richard Evans & Hofmann, Albert, Plants of the Gods: Origins of Hallucinogenic use,  Hutchinson, London 1980 
Shermer, Michael, In Darwin's shadow: the life and science of Alfred Russel Wallace : a biographical study on the psychology of history, Oxford University Press US, 2002 
Wright, Robin M. & Hill, Jonathan D ‘Venancio Kamiko: Wakuenai Shaman and Messiah,’ in E. Jean Langdon and. Gerhard Baer, (eds.) Portals of Power: : Shamanism in South America,  University of New Mexico Press, 1992 1992  pp. 257–286.
 Znamenski, Andrei A. The beauty of the primitive: shamanism and Western imagination, Oxford University Press US, 2007 

Indigenous peoples of the Amazon
Indigenous peoples in Brazil
Indigenous peoples in Colombia